The Tulli Papyrus is claimed to be a transcription of an Egyptian papyrus dating from the reign of Thutmose III. The claim originated in a 1953 article published in Doubt, the Fortean Society magazine, by Tiffany Thayer. According to Thayer, the transcription was sent to him by Boris de Rachewiltz who supposedly found the original transcription of the papyrus among papers left by Alberto Tulli, a deceased Vatican museum director. References to "circles of fire" or "fiery discs" allegedly contained in the translation have been interpreted in UFO and Fortean literature as evidence of ancient flying saucers, although ufologists Jacques Vallee and Chris Aubeck have described it as a "hoax". According to Vallee and Aubeck, since Tulli had supposedly copied it during a single viewing of the original papyrus using an "Ancient Egyptian shorthand", and de Rachewiltz had never seen the original, the alleged text likely contained transcription errors, making it impossible to verify.

Author Erich von Daniken included the Tulli Papyrus in his speculations of ancient visitations by extraterrestrials. In the 1968 Condon Report, Samuel Rosenberg reported that it was likely that "Tulli was taken in and that the papyrus is a fake". Rosenberg cited the Tulli Papyrus as an example of stories circulated among UFO book authors "taken from secondary and tertiary sources without any attempt to verify original sources" and concluded that "all accounts of 'UFO-like sightings handed down through the ages' are doubtful – until verified".

References

External links
The Tulli Papyrus - Larry Orcutt's Catchpenny Mysteries of Ancient Egypt Explained by Larry Orcutt.

Egyptian papyri
Ufology
Hoaxes in the United States